1286 Banachiewicza is an elongated Eos asteroid from the outer regions of the asteroid belt. It was discovered on 25 August 1933, by Belgian astronomer Sylvain Arend at the Royal Observatory of Belgium in Uccle. It was named after Polish astronomer Tadeusz Banachiewicz.

Orbit and classification 

Banachiewicza is a member the Eos family, the largest asteroid family in the outer main belt consisting of nearly 10,000 asteroids. It orbits the Sun at a distance of 2.8–3.3 AU once every 5 years and 3 months (1,921 days). Its orbit has an eccentricity of 0.09 and an inclination of 10° with respect to the ecliptic.

Naming 

This minor planet was named after Polish astronomer Tadeusz Banachiewicz (1882–1954), who was also a prominent mathematician and geodesist, as well as the director of the Kraków Observatory and vice-president of the International Astronomical Union in the 1930s. The subsequently numbered asteroid 1287 Lorcia – also discovered by Sylvain Arend, and also an Eoan asteroid – was named after his wife. The official naming citation was mentioned in The Names of the Minor Planets by Paul Herget in 1955. The lunar crater Banachiewicz was also named in his honor.

Physical characteristics 

In the Tholen classification, Banachiewicza is a stony S-type asteroid, while the overall spectral type of the Eos family is that of a K-type.

Rotation period and poles 

In August 2008, the best-rated rotational lightcurve of Banachiewicza was obtained from photometric observations by French amateur astronomers Laurent Bernasconi, Cyril Cavadore and Stéphane Charbonnel. Lightcurve analysis gave a rotation period of 8.631 hours with a brightness variation of 0.54 magnitude, indicative for an irregular, elongated shape.

Other observations at the Palomar Transient Factory in California, and by a collaboration of Hungarian astronomers gave a period of 8.628 and 5 hours with an amplitude of 0.36 and 0.4 magnitude, respectively. In 2013, an international study modeled a lightcurve with a concurring period of  hours and found two spin axis of (214.0°, 62.0°) and (64.0°, 60.0°) in ecliptic coordinates (λ, β).

Diameter and albedo 

According to the surveys carried out by the Japanese Akari satellite and the NEOWISE mission of NASA's Wide-field Infrared Survey Explorer, Banachiewicza measures between 21.474 and 22.569 kilometers in diameter and its surface has an albedo between 0.1554 and 0.171. The Collaborative Asteroid Lightcurve Link assumes a standard albedo for stony asteroids of 0.20 and calculates a diameter of 19.82 kilometers based on an absolute magnitude of 10.88.

References

External links 

 Lightcurve Database Query (LCDB), at www.minorplanet.info
 Dictionary of Minor Planet Names, Google books
 Asteroids and comets rotation curves, CdR – Geneva Observatory, Raoul Behrend
 Discovery Circumstances: Numbered Minor Planets (1)-(5000) – Minor Planet Center
 
 

001286
Discoveries by Sylvain Arend
Named minor planets
001286
19330825